Boogaloo is the twentieth studio album by the Scottish hard rock band Nazareth, released in August 1998. It was produced by Mike Ging.

It was the last studio recording to feature drummer and founding member Darrell Sweet before his death in 1999. The album also features guest performances by bassist Pete Agnew's son Lee, who later replaced Sweet as the band's drummer.
The album was recorded at the Parkgate studios, Catsfield in East Sussex in 1997. 11 of the 12 tracks were mixed in early 1998, with horns and guitar overdubs added. 
During the original recording, the Hale-Bopp comet was clearly visible.

Original versions of some tracks (as mixed in 1997), including one that didn't make the 1998 remix, were included in the Loud And Proud box set.

The character on the album artwork is known as 'Boogaloo'. The phrase comes from what the band would say when ready to go onstage – "Let's Boogaloo", a choice made in discussion with the fanclub editor who was present during the recording.

Track listing

2011 Salvo and 2014 vinyl bonus tracks 

The bonus tracks are from The Very Best of Nazareth compilation (2001) released as part of 30th anniversary digitally remastered catalogue.
The 2011 remastered CD release of Boogaloo was paired with Move Me.

Personnel 
Nazareth
 Pete Agnew – bass guitar, backing vocals
 Dan McCafferty – lead vocals
 Ronnie Leahy – keyboards
 Jimmy Murrison – guitars
 Darrell Sweet – drums
Additional personnel 
 Lee Agnew – percussion
 Simon Clark – alto & baritone saxophones
 Tim Sanders – tenor saxophone
 Roddy Lorimer, Paul Spong – trumpet

References 

Nazareth (band) albums
1998 albums
SPV/Steamhammer albums